Ralph Heydecker (born 2 April 1965) is a retired Swiss football midfielder.

References

1965 births
Living people
Swiss men's footballers
FC Schaffhausen players
FC Zürich players
Association football midfielders
Swiss Super League players
People from Schaffhausen
Sportspeople from the canton of Schaffhausen